Jacques-Paul Bertrand (1930–2006) was a French film producer. He also directed two films.

Selected filmography
 Dynamite Jack (1961)
 Good King Dagobert (1963)
 Badmen of the West (1964)
 The Double Bed (1965)
 Triple Cross (1966)
 The Sultans (1966)
 Darling Caroline (1968)
 The Servant (1970)

References

Bibliography 
 Murphy, Robert. British Cinema and the Second World War. Bloomsbury Publishing, 2005.

External links 
 

1930 births
2006 deaths
French film producers
French film directors
Film people from Paris